Üzü may refer to:
Çay Üzü - meaning "River Üzü" - Azerbaijan
Dağ Üzü - meaning "Mountain Üzü" - Azerbaijan